Jane Elizabeth Magnus-Stinson (born April 29, 1958) is a United States district judge of the United States District Court for the Southern District of Indiana.

Early life and education

Born in La Crosse, Wisconsin, Magnus-Stinson earned a Bachelor of Arts degree from Butler University in 1979 and a Juris Doctor from the Indiana University Robert H. McKinney School of Law in 1983.

Professional career 

From 1983 until 1990, Magnus-Stinson worked as an associate for a law firm in Indianapolis. From 1991 until 1995, she worked for then-Governor Evan Bayh, first as an executive assistant in 1991 and then as Counsel to the Governor from 1991 until 1995. She also served as Bayh's Deputy Chief of Staff from 1994 until 1995. From 1995 until 2007, Magnus-Stinson served as a Superior Court judge in Marion County, Indiana, in the Criminal Division. In January 2007, Magnus-Stinson became a United States magistrate judge of the United States District Court for the Southern District of Indiana, a position she held until becoming a federal district judge in 2010.

Federal judicial service 

In November 2008, Magnus-Stinson notified Bayh, who by that point had become one of Indiana's two senators, of interest in a district court judgeship. After Magnus-Stinson underwent a series of interviews with officials from the United States Department of Justice and the Office of the White House Counsel, President Obama on January 20, 2010 nominated Magnus-Stinson to the seat on the Southern District of Indiana, to replace Judge Larry J. McKinney, who took senior status on July 4, 2009. On March 11, 2010, the United States Senate Committee on the Judiciary reported Magnus-Stinson's nomination to the full United States Senate. The Senate confirmed Magnus-Stinson in a voice vote on June 7, 2010. She received her commission on June 9, 2010. She became Chief Judge on November 23, 2016. and served until March 20, 2021.

References

External links

1958 births
Living people
American women lawyers
Butler University alumni
Indiana University Robert H. McKinney School of Law alumni
Judges of the United States District Court for the Southern District of Indiana
People from Indianapolis
People from La Crosse, Wisconsin
United States district court judges appointed by Barack Obama
United States magistrate judges
21st-century American judges
21st-century American women judges